The 1994 Campeonato Paulista de Futebol Profissional da Primeira Divisão - Série A1 was the 93rd season of São Paulo's top professional football league. Palmeiras  won the championship by the 20th time. Ituano, Mogi Mirim and Santo André were relegated.

Championship
The championship was disputed in a double round-robin format, with the team with the most points being champion and the bottom three teams being relegated.

Top Scores

References

Campeonato Paulista seasons
Paulista